Mihriban Kaya (born March 10, 1996) is a Turkish female Paralympian athlete with an intellectual disability competing in the F20 disability class of shot put event.

Mihriban Kaya was born in northeastern city of Gümüşhane in Turkey on March 10, 1996.

Kaya captured the gold medal in the women's pentathlon event at the 2016 INAS Athletics Indoor Championships held in Ancona, Italy.

She competed in the shot put F20 event at the 2016 IPC Athletics European Championships in Grosseto, Italy, and obtained a quota spot for the 2016 Paralympics in Rio de Janeiro, Brazil after throwing 11.32 meters, a personal best distance of her.

References

1996 births
Living people
Female competitors in athletics with disabilities
Sportspeople from Gümüşhane
Intellectual Disability category Paralympic competitors
Turkish female shot putters
Paralympic athletes of Turkey
Athletes (track and field) at the 2016 Summer Paralympics
Competitors in athletics with intellectual disability